Hamza Abdel Mawla (26 October 1923 – 26 July 1987) was an Egyptian footballer. He competed in the men's tournament at the 1952 Summer Olympics.

He competed with Tersana SC for over a decade, and worked with both the Egyptian and Saudi national football teams after his retirement.

References

External links
 
 

1923 births
1987 deaths
Egyptian footballers
Egypt international footballers
Olympic footballers of Egypt
Footballers at the 1952 Summer Olympics
Place of birth missing
Association football defenders
Mediterranean Games silver medalists for Egypt
Mediterranean Games medalists in football
Footballers at the 1951 Mediterranean Games
Tersana SC players